Khalileh Sara (also Romanized as Khalīleh Sarā; also known as Khalīl Ḩayāţī-ye Maḩalleh and Khalīl Sarā-ye Ḩavīq) is a village in Haviq Rural District, Haviq District, Talesh County, Gilan Province, Iran. At the 2006 census, its population was 447, in 80 families.

References 

Populated places in Talesh County